The Ingolstadt–Kralupy–Litvínov pipeline (also known as IKL pipeline and MERO pipeline) is a crude oil pipeline in Central Europe. It facilitates the transport of crude oil from Germany to the Czech oil refineries of Kralupy and Litvínov. The name of the Ingolstadt–Kralupy–Litvínov pipeline is misleading, as the pipeline does not start in Ingolstadt and does not run to Kralupy and Litvínov.

History 

Negotiations to construct the Ingolstadt–Kralupy–Litvínov pipeline started in October 1990 and were concluded in 1992. Originally, the pipeline was planned to run from Ingolstadt to Litvínov, but the route was changed to run from Vohburg to Nelahozeves. However, the original name of the pipeline was kept.

Construction of the pipeline started on 1 September 1994 and was completed in December 2005.  It was inaugurated on 13 March 1996.  It is the main pipeline in the Czech Republic allowing oil supplies other than those of Russian origin. In 2003, the pipeline was modernized by improving remote control systems and increasing capacity.

Route 

The  pipeline starts from Vohburg in Germany, where it is connected with the Transalpine Pipeline, and ends at the oil depot in Nelahozeves near Prague in the Czech Republic.

Technical description 

The capacity of the pipeline is around ten million tonnes per year, of which normally 30% is in use. The additional capacity is reserved for securing oil supplies in case of disruption of Russian supplies through the Druzhba pipeline, as happened in July 2008. The control center, which controls the whole pipeline, is located in Vohburg. The backup control center is located in Nelahozeves.

Operating company 

The pipeline is operated by MERO Pipeline GmbH.

See also

 Energy in the Czech Republic

References 

Energy infrastructure completed in 1996
Oil pipelines in the Czech Republic
Oil pipelines in Germany
Czech Republic–Germany relations